The Simonini Mini 3 is an Italian aircraft engine, designed and produced by Simonini Racing of San Dalmazio di Serramazzoni for use in ultralight aircraft.

Design and development
The Mini 3 is a single cylinder twin cylinder two-stroke, air liquid-cooled, gasoline engine design, with a poly V belt reduction drive with reduction ratios of 2.49:1, 2.57:1 and 2.76:1. It employs electronic ignition and produces  at 7000 rpm.

Applications
AEF Monotrace
Sperwill 3+

Specifications (Mini 3)

See also

References

External links

Air-cooled aircraft piston engines
Simonini aircraft engines
Two-stroke aircraft piston engines